Pictograph Cave may refer to the following places in the United States: 

Pictograph Cave (Mountain View, Arkansas)
Talagi Pictograph Cave, Andersen Air Force Base, Guam
Carter Caves Pictograph (15CR60), Olive Hill, Kentucky, listed on the NRHP in Carter County, Kentucky
Pictograph Cave (Billings, Montana)
Pictograph Cave, Arnold Lava Tube System, Deschutes County, Oregon
Pictograph Cave (Hillsboro, Texas), listed on the NRHP in Hill County, Texas